Alexandra Mîrca (born 11 October 1993) is a Moldovan archer. She competed in the 2016 Summer Olympics. She competed  at the 2020 Summer Olympics, in Women's individual, and Mixed team.

She competed at the 2010 Summer Youth Olympics, in Singapore, and 2019 European Games .

Individual performance timeline in Outdoor Recurve

References

1993 births
Living people
Moldovan female archers
Sportspeople from Chișinău
Archers at the 2010 Summer Youth Olympics
Archers at the 2016 Summer Olympics
Archers at the 2020 Summer Olympics
Olympic archers of Moldova
Archers at the 2015 European Games
Archers at the 2019 European Games
European Games competitors for Moldova